Les Carson ( Leslie Merle Carlson; February 24, 1933 – May 3, 2014) was an American-Canadian film and television character actor who acted on stage in Canada, the U.S. and England. His films include the horror films Deranged, Black Christmas, and Videodrome, as well as the family film A Christmas Story. His television credits include The Twilight Zone and The X-Files. He was sometimes billed as "Les Carlson" and sometimes as "Leslie Carlson".

Early life 
Born in the small South Dakota city of Mitchell, Carlson earned both a BFA and a MA from the University of South Dakota, which he attended in the 1950s and began his acting career performing in several stage plays in both the U.S and England.

Career 
His performances include A Walk in the Woods in 1991 at the Gateway Theatre and Glengarry Glen Ross, Jekyll & Hyde (musical), Hamlet, Joggers, All My Sons and Death and the Maiden. He immigrated to Canada in the late 1960s and began acting in many films and TV shows in the early '70s.  His most memorable film roles were in the horror classic Black Christmas and Deranged, both in 1974 and as a pushy Christmas tree salesman in A Christmas Story in 1983. Carlson appeared in four movies from director David Cronenberg, including Videodrome and The Dead Zone.  His TV appearances include The X-Files, Friday the 13th: The Series, 21 Jump Street and Road to Avonlea.

Personal life 
Carlson was married to actress Patricia Hamilton and they had one child together, actor Ben Carlson.  He had another son, Edmund Carlson, with his second wife, Joan Warren, in 1988. He died of cancer in Toronto, Ontario, aged 81.

Filmography

References

External links
 

1933 births
American male film actors
American male television actors
American male stage actors
2014 deaths
University of South Dakota alumni
American expatriate male actors in Canada
American expatriate male actors in the United Kingdom
20th-century American male actors
21st-century American male actors
Male actors from South Dakota
People from Mitchell, South Dakota